Laketown may refer to:

United States 
Laketown, Utah
Laketown, Wisconsin
Laketown Township, Minnesota
Laketown Township, Michigan

Fiction 
Laketown (Middle-earth), from J. R. R. Tolkien's The Hobbit

See also
 Laketon (disambiguation)
 Lake Town (disambiguation)